Bubas is a genus of Scarabaeidae in the superfamily Scarabaeoidea. This genus has been found in Spain, France, Poland and Italy.

Notes

Further reading
 Colomba, M. S.; Vitturi, R.; Libertini, A.; Gregorini, A. and Zunino, M.  (January 2006) "Heterochromatin of the scarab beetle, Bubas bison (Coleoptera: Scarabaeidae) II. Evidence for AT-rich compartmentalization and a high amount of rDNA copies" Micron 37(1): pp. 47–51
 Kirk, A. A. (1983) "The biology of Bubas bison (L.) (Coleoptera: Scarabaeidae) in southern France and its potential for recycling dung in Australia" Bulletin of Entomological Research 73: pp. 129–136
 Klemperer, H. G. (1981) "Nest construction and larval behaviour of Bubas bison (L.) and Bubas bubalus (01.) (Coleoptera, Scarabaeidae)" Ecological Entomology 6(1): pp. 23–33

Scarabaeidae